Aban is the Avestan language term for "the waters", used in Zoroastrian doctrine.

Aban may also refer to:
Aban (month), eighth month of the Solar Hijri calendar
Aba (people), an ethnic group of Siberia

Places
Aban, Russia, a rural locality (a settlement) in Krasnoyarsk Krai, Russia
Aban (river), a river in Krasnoyarsk Krai, Russia
Aban (crater), a crater on Mars, named after Aban, Russia

Other uses
Aban (name), notable people with the surname or given name
Aban number, a number written in English without the letter A
Aban Air, call sign ABAN, see Airline codes-A

See also